The Rajya Sabha or Council of States is the Upper House of the Parliament of India. Membership is limited to 250 members, and the present Rajya Sabha has 245 members. 23 members are elected by the Vidhan Sabha members and 12 are nominated by the President for their contributions to art, literature, science, and social services. Members sit for overlapping six years terms, with one-third of the members retiring every two years.

Andhra Pradesh

Keys:

Arunachal Pradesh

Keys:

Assam

Keys:

Bihar

Keys:

Chhattisgarh

Keys:

Goa

Keys:

Gujarat

Keys:

Haryana

Keys:

Himachal Pradesh

Keys:

Jharkhand

Keys:

Karnataka

Keys:

Kerala

Keys:

Madhya Pradesh

Keys:

Maharashtra

Keys:

Manipur

Keys:

Meghalaya

Keys:

Mizoram

Keys:

Nagaland

Keys:

Odisha

Keys:

Punjab

Keys:

Rajasthan

Keys:

Sikkim

Keys:

Tamil Nadu

Keys:

Telangana

Keys:

Tripura

Keys:

Uttar Pradesh

Keys:

Uttarakhand

 
Keys:

West Bengal

Keys:

Jammu and Kashmir

NCT of Delhi

Keys:

Puducherry

Keys:

Nominated
 
 
Keys:

Membership by party

Members of the Rajya Sabha by their political party:

See also
 List of current members of the Lok Sabha
List of members of the 17th Lok Sabha
 Member of Parliament, Rajya Sabha

References

External links
 Rajya Sabha
 Rajya Sabha Secretariat

 
R